Raúl Vallejo Suárez (born 25 August 1996) is a Spanish footballer who plays for CA Bembibre as a central midfielder.

Club career
Born in León, Vallejo finished his formation with CD Fútbol Peña, as a forward. In 2015 he signed for Tercera División side CD La Virgen del Camino, moving to the central midfielder role during the pre-season; he made his senior debut on 23 August of that year, starting in a 0–1 away loss against Villaralbo CF.

Vallejo scored his first senior goal on 31 October 2015, netting the first in a 4–1 home routing of Ciudad Rodrigo CF. The following 9 July, after being an undisputed starter, he moved to fellow fourth division club Atlético Astorga FC.

On 15 August 2017 Vallejo joined CD Numancia, being assigned to the reserves still in the fourth tier. He made his first team debut on 6 September, coming on as a late substitute for goalscorer Marc Mateu in a 1–0 away win against Real Oviedo, for the season's Copa del Rey.

On 4 July 2019, Vallejo signed for Zamora CF, still in the fourth tier.

References

External links

1996 births
Living people
Sportspeople from León, Spain
Spanish footballers
Footballers from Castile and León
Association football midfielders
Segunda División B players
Tercera División players
Tercera Federación players
Atlético Astorga FC players
CD Numancia B players
CD Numancia players
Zamora CF footballers